(born August 24, 1976 in Kadoma, Osaka) is a Japanese baseball player. He played for the Osaka Kintetsu Buffaloes from 1999 to 2003. In the 1999 draft, he was selected as the number 1 overall pick.

External links
Player profile

1976 births
Living people
Baseball people from Osaka Prefecture
People from Kadoma, Osaka
Japanese baseball players
Nippon Professional Baseball pitchers
Osaka Kintetsu Buffaloes players
Yokohama BayStars players